is a Japanese manga artist. She is best known for creating the yuri manga series Bloom Into You, which has been a commercial success and spawned a media franchise encompassing an anime, light novels, a stage play, and an anthology manga spinoff. Nakatani is also known as a creator of doujinshi works, particularly those based on the Touhou Project series. Her current work is God Bless the Mistaken, currently being serialized in Dengeki Daioh. She is a native of Shiga Prefecture.

Career 
Nakatani's professional pen name, Nio, is the Japanese term for little grebe, which is the official bird of her home prefecture of Shiga. As the little grebe is known as a long-lived bird in Shiga, she hopes it will grant her a "long and successful career." Nakatani admits however that, in reality, she came up with "Nio" by scrambling her real name, and the relation to the bird was a coincidence.

According to Nakatani, she became first interested in drawing manga about girls when reading Yun Kōga's manga Loveless, "which has no girls in it" and led her to realize "I might like stories about girls." In 2014, Nakatani submitted her one-shot work Farewell to My Alter, which she had previously self-published, to the Dengeki Daioh magazine. Farewell to My Alter appeared in the magazine in October of 2014 as Nakatani's professional debut, winning her a Gold award in the 21st Dengeki Comics Grand Prize contest. Nakatani created one additional one-shot work for the magazine, Tear-Flavored Escargot, which appeared in the December 2014 issue prior to her first serialization.

Although Nakatani viewed her works as being about "human relationships" and did not intentionally set out to write yuri, she gained a reputation as a "yuri mangaka," leading the editor of Dengeki Daioh to approach her at a doujinshi convention, asking if she wanted to draw a yuri series for the magazine. This led Nakatani to create Bloom Into You, her debut serialized work, with the intention of creating a yuri story "that could only be seen as yuri no matter which way you looked at it."

Bloom Into You began its serialization in Dengeki Daioh on April 27th, 2015 and concluded on September 27th, 2019 after a 45-chapter run. The series had over 1,000,000 copies in print in Japan as of 2019, and placed 4th in the 2017 Next Manga Awards from Niconico and Da Vinci. It has been adapted into an anime series and a stage play, and received spinoffs in the form of light novels and anthology comics. 

After the completion of Bloom Into You, Nakatani expressed that she wanted her next work to be of a genre other than yuri, as she felt she had already written the yuri story she wished to write (although she implied she might consider including girl-girl couples in some capacity in her future works). Nakatani's current work, Kami-sama ga Machigaeru, was announced in Dengeki Daioh on September 26th, 2021, and began serialization on October 27th, 2021. It is being simultaneously published digitally in English by Yen Press under the title God Bless the Mistaken.

Nakatani has collaborated as an illustrator with light novel writer and Adachi and Shimamura author Hitoma Iruma, first on the Bloom Into You light novel spinoff series Regarding Saeki Sayaka, and later on End Blue and Shoujo Mousou Chuu.

Works

Published manga 
 
 Tear-Flavored Escargot

Light novels 
  (as illustrator; writer: Hitoma Iruma)
  (as illustrator; writer: Hitoma Iruma)
  (as illustrator; writer: Hitoma Iruma)

Anthologies/compilations

Art books

Doujinshi works 

Self-published under the pen name .

 
 Mimesis Dolls
 
 
 
 
 
 
 
 
 
 
 BLOODBERRY TRAP

Notes

References

External links
 Official website 
 Official site for Nakatani's doujinshi works 
 Nio Nakatani on Anime News Network Encyclopedia

Manga artists from Shiga Prefecture
Year of birth missing (living people)
Living people
Japanese women artists
Women manga artists
Touhou Project